Kalinovka is a rural locality (a selo) in Khomutovsky District of Kursk Oblast, Russia, located about  east of the border with Ukraine and only  from the M3 highway. Kalinovka is known for being the birthplace of Nikita Khrushchev (1894-1971).

Nikita Khrushchev
During his reign as General Secretary of the USSR, Khrushchev denounced the crimes of Joseph Stalin in a speech widely referred to as the Secret Speech, although Khrushchev himself had taken part in his activities in Ukraine. Moreover, Khrushchev sponsored the early Soviet Space programme and won popularity among the Soviet people thanks to his handling of the Suez Crisis, the Syrian Crisis of 1957, the launching of Sputnik and the 1960 U-2 incident. Despite his attempts at bettering the lives of Soviet people, he later became unpopular in the USSR due to his handling of the Cuban Missile Crisis, and was later ousted by the next General Secretary, Leonid Brezhnev. He was placed in retirement and smuggled his memoirs to the West in 1970, one year before his death.

Khrushchev was very proud of his origins and was very different from his American counterparts. To take John F. Kennedy as an example, Khrushchev was short, fat and from a peasant family, unlike Kennedy who was tall, thin and from the wealthy and prominent Kennedy family originating in Massachusetts. 

Famously, in a conference, Khrushchev declared to the Western Bloc that he would “bury” the USA (We will bury you!). Khrushchev was said to be a man of great character and understanding for the people of his country, although especially towards the end of his career, many saw him as incompetent. Khrushchev was also ruthless in dealing with opponents, becoming the unlikely leader of the USSR after Stalin instead of rivals Georgy Malenkov, who briefly held power for a time, and Vyacheslav Molotov.

References

Rural localities in Kursk Oblast
Dmitriyevsky Uyezd